Malatesta is a 1970 German drama film directed by Peter Lilienthal and starring Eddie Constantine. It was entered into the 1970 Cannes Film Festival. It contains some biographical aspects of the life and thoughts of the Italian anarchist Errico Malatesta.

Cast
 Eddie Constantine as Malatesta
 Christine Noonan as Nina Vassileva
 Vladimír Pucholt as Gardstein
 Diana Senior as Ljuba Milstein
 Heathcote Williams as Josef Solokow
 Wallas Eaton as The Priest (as Wallace Eaton)
 Sheila Gill as Mrs. Gershon
 Sigi Graue as Fritz Svaars (as Siegfried Graue)
 Peter Hirsche as Cafiero

References

External links

1970 films
1970s biographical films
German biographical films
West German films
1970s German-language films
Films directed by Peter Lilienthal
Films set in London
Films set in 1910
Films set in 1911
Films about anarchism
1970s German films